"A Man Holdin' On (To a Woman Lettin' Go)" is a song written by Gene Dobbins, John Ramey and Bobby Taylor, and recorded by American country music artist Ty Herndon.  It was released in March 1998 as the first single from his album Big Hopes.  The song reached number 5 on the Billboard Hot Country Singles & Tracks chart in July 1998.

Content
The song offers up different lyrical snapshots of men in difficult transitions. These include a woman losing her virginity, a lady who has broke up with a man who turns to drink, a father "walking his daughter down the aisle" at a wedding, and an old man whose wife is dying. In each case, a man is struggling to hold on to "a woman letting go".

Critical reception
Larry Flick, of Billboard magazine reviewed the song favorably saying that the "caliber of the song, combined with Herndon's strong vocal performance and Byron Gallimore's skilled production, should guarantee it heavy airplay."

Music video
The music video was directed by Steven Goldmann and premiered in early 1998.

Chart performance
"A Man Holdin' On" debuted at number 74 on the U.S. Billboard Hot Country Singles & Tracks for the week of March 28, 1998.

Year-end charts

References

1998 singles
Ty Herndon songs
Song recordings produced by Byron Gallimore
Epic Records singles
Music videos directed by Steven Goldmann
1998 songs
Songs written by Gene Dobbins